Gordon Sherry (born 8 April 1974) is a Scottish professional golfer most recognised for winning The Amateur Championship in 1995.

Sherry enjoyed his greatest moments as an amateur, winning The Amateur Championship, being a member of the victorious Great Britain and Ireland Walker Cup team, and appearing in The Open Championship and the Masters Tournament.

Career

Amateur
In 1994 Sherry finished as runner up in The Amateur Championship and played in the Eisenhower Trophy, where the Great Britain team finished as runners up. The following year, he won The Amateur Championship at Royal Liverpool Golf Club, and finished fourth overall in the Scottish Open, behind only Wayne Riley, Nick Faldo and Colin Montgomerie.

His win in the Amateur Championship gave Sherry the opportunity to play in both the Open Championship and the Masters Tournament, two of golf major championships. He gained significant attention during his participation in the 1995 Open which was played at St Andrews, starting when he made a hole in one during a practice round playing alongside Jack Nicklaus and Tom Watson. Although he finished behind Steve Webster in the race for the Silver Medal as the lowest scoring amateur, he collected £1 from fellow amateur Tiger Woods, with whom he had a friendly wager over who would achieve the highest-placed finish.

Sherry faced Woods again later that year as a member of the Great Britain and Ireland Walker Cup team. He again came out on top as Great Britain and Ireland recorded only their fourth win in the competition.

Professional
After appearing in the Masters in April 1996, Sherry turned professional. Despite several visits to qualifying school he never won his European Tour card. As a result, he had to rely mostly on sponsors' invitations to compete. He never managed to win a tour event although he did win the Mauritius Open in 1997.

Sherry last attempted to qualify for the European Tour in 2002. After a four-year break from competition, he started playing on the Scottish Tartan Tour in 2009 and now splits his time between tournaments on the Tartan Tour and coaching.  He has also been involved with Prodream USA, a consultancy assisting British golfers to obtain scholarships to American universities, run by fellow ex-Walker Cup golfer Lorne Kelly.

Personal life
Sherry was born in Kilmarnock. He graduated with a degree in biochemistry from the University of Stirling. He now lives in Helensburgh with his wife Alison and their five children.

Amateur wins
1995 The Amateur Championship

Professional wins
1997 Mauritius Open

Results in major championships

Note: Sherry never played in the U.S. Open or the PGA Championship.

CUT = missed the half-way cut
"T" = tied

Team appearances
Amateur
European Boys' Team Championship (representing Scotland): 1992 (winners)
Eisenhower Trophy (representing Great Britain & Ireland): 1994
St Andrews Trophy (representing Great Britain & Ireland): 1994 (winners)
Walker Cup (representing Great Britain & Ireland): 1995 (winners)
European Amateur Team Championship (representing Scotland): 1995 (winners)

References

External links

Scottish male golfers
European Tour golfers
Sportspeople from Kilmarnock
People from Helensburgh
Sportspeople from Argyll and Bute
1974 births
Living people